Long Beach, California, held an election for mayor on April 8, 2014 and June 2, 2014. It saw the election of Robert Garcia.

In winning, Garcia became the first openly gay person to be elected Mayor of Long Beach. Garcia is a Democrat, but was elected without a party affiliation, as municipal elections in California are officially non-partisan.

Incumbent Bob Foster was term limited.

Results

First round

Runoff

References 

Long Beach
Mayoral elections in Long Beach, California
Long Beach